The 1995–96 season is the second season of Golden, the preceder of Sun Hei SC in Hong Kong First Division League.

Squad statistics

Statistics accurate as of match played 31 May 1996

Matches

Competitive

References

Sun Hei SC seasons
Gold